Kevin Gary Olsen (born July 26, 1976) is an American former professional baseball pitcher.

External links

1976 births
Living people
Albuquerque Isotopes players
American expatriate baseball players in Canada
Baseball players from California
Brevard County Manatees players
Calgary Cannons players
Florida Marlins players
Jupiter Hammerheads players
Kane County Cougars players
Major League Baseball pitchers
Midland RockHounds players
Oklahoma Sooners baseball players
People from Covina, California
Portland Sea Dogs players
Riverside City Tigers baseball players
Sacramento River Cats players
Sussex Skyhawks players
Utica Blue Sox players